Florestano Vancini (24 August 1926 – 18 September 2008) was an Italian film director and screenwriter.

He directed over 20 films since 1960. His 1966 film Le stagioni del nostro amore, starring Enrico Maria Salerno, was entered into the 16th Berlin International Film Festival. His 1973 film The Assassination of Matteotti was entered into the 8th Moscow International Film Festival where it won a Special Prize. In 1999 he was a member of the jury at the 21st Moscow International Film Festival.

Filmography as director
Delta padano (cortometraggio, 1951)
Long Night in 1943 (1960)
La banda Casaroli (1962)
Le italiane e l'amore (1962)
La calda vita (1964)
Seasons of Our Love (1966)
Long Days of Vengeance (1967)
Blow Hot, Blow Cold (1969)
The Sicilian Checkmate (1972)
Bronte - Cronaca di un massacro che i libri di storia non hanno raccontato (1972)
Il delitto Matteotti (1973)
Amore amaro (1974)
Un dramma borghese (1979)
La baraonda (1980)
La neve nel bicchiere (1984)
La piovra,  (TV) (1984)
...e ridendo l'uccise (2005)

References

External links
 

1926 births
2008 deaths
20th-century Italian screenwriters
Italian male screenwriters
Italian film directors
20th-century Italian male writers